The Brawo Open, known as Nord/LB Open until 2010 and the Sparkassen Open until 2021, is a professional tennis tournament played on outdoor red clay courts. It is currently part of the Association of Tennis Professionals (ATP) Challenger Tour. It is held annually at the Braunschweiger Tennis- und Hockey Club in Braunschweig, Germany, since 1994.

In 2005, 2014, 2015, and 2016 the tournament received the ATP Challenger of the Year award from the Association of Tennis Professionals.

Past finals

Singles

Doubles

References

External links
Official website
ITF search

 
ATP Challenger Tour
Clay court tennis tournaments
Tennis tournaments in Germany
Sport in Braunschweig
Recurring sporting events established in 1994